Somerville is a NJ Transit railroad station on the Raritan Valley Line, located south of the downtown center of Somerville, in Somerset County, New Jersey, United States. The historic station building on the north side of the tracks has been restored and now is used by a law firm.  Parking lots are located to the south of the station and there is a tunnel there to access the platforms. Like many of the stations on the Raritan Valley Line, Somerville was not a wheelchair accessible station until December 7, 2010.

History
In 2004, the station's parking lot was expanded, toward the two railroad tracks, from the south side, to include parking for another 68 cars.  These spaces are no longer available as a construction project is in progress.

At some point, the stationhouse and the train tracks were on the same level. An historical photo of the Somerville station with the tracks in front of it can be seen in the Arcadia Publishing historical photo book Somerset County in Postcards, by Alan A. Siegel, Somerset County Historical Society.
In 2009, a reconstruction project began at the station to install high-level platforms and make the station handicap accessible.  This project includes new ramps, renovations to the existing tunnel, rehabilitation of the existing freight elevator shafts, a new tunnel headhouse, and demolition of the two existing waiting rooms. It was announced on December 1, 2010 that the high level platforms would open on Tuesday, December 7, 2010 to allow for demolition of the low level platforms and continued platform construction. The historic station depot is being kept.

Starting January 12, 2015, NJ Transit Raritan Valley Line started Midtown Direct service between New York City and Somerville and its surrounding area.

Station layout
The station has two high-level side platforms.

Bibliography

References

External links

world.nycsubway.org - NJT Raritan Line
 Bridge Street entrance from Google Maps Street View

NJ Transit Rail Operations stations
Somerville, New Jersey
Former Central Railroad of New Jersey stations
Railway stations in the United States opened in 1842
1842 establishments in New Jersey